Al-Bustan (eng.: The Garden) is a beach resort in Gaza with restaurants, cafes and swimming pools.   It is located on the beach north of Gaza City.

About 800 people come on a typical day.   The atmosphere is very Islamic, women wear veils and only Islamic music is played.  One visitor, "wearing head-to-toe black garb and a veil" told a Reuters correspondent that "The atmosphere is Islamic. It's a place where you feel relaxed."

According to the Reuters, the resort was built by a "Hamas-linked charity,"   The ceremonies were attended by Fathi Hamad, the Interior Minister of the Hamas-led government and other "prominent"   Hamas elected members of the Palestinian Legislative Council. According to The Independent, "There is a widespread assumption in Gaza that Hamas... or at least businessmen close to the Islamic faction, are behind the venture." 

According to Egyptian journalist Ashraf Abu Al-Houl writing in Al-Ahram, Al-Bustan is one of a rapidly growing group of Gaza pleasure parks, including Zahrat Al-Madain and the Crazy Water Park, so many of which were completed between his visit to Gaza in February and his return in July 2010 as to make Gaza "almost unrecognizable."  He continues, "A sense of absolute prosperity prevails, as manifested by the grand resorts along and near Gaza's coast. Further, the sight of the merchandise and luxuries filling the Gaza shops amazed me. Merchandise is sold more cheaply than in Egypt, although most of it is from the Egyptian market, and there are added shipping costs and costs for smuggling it via the tunnels – so that it could be expected to be more expensive... the siege was broken even before Israel's crime against the ships of the Freedom Flotilla in late May; everything already was coming into the Gaza Strip from Egypt. If this weren't the case, businessmen would not have been able to build so many resorts in under four months."

According to Reuters, the resort is part of a "construction boom" in "recreational facilities" that has prompted some to criticize Hamas for putting money into entertainment venues like El-Bustan and the Crazy Water Park rather than into housing and infrastructure. Two months later, Crazy Water Park was burned down by masked men, in September 2010.

References

Amusement parks in the State of Palestine
Companies based in the State of Palestine
Tourist attractions in the State of Palestine
Buildings and structures in Gaza City